Since the fall of communism in 1989, the nature of migration to and from Poland has been in flux. After Poland's accession to the European Union and accession to the Schengen Area in particular, a significant number of Poles, estimated at over two million, have emigrated, primarily to the United Kingdom, Germany, France and Ireland. The majority of them, according to the Central Statistical Office of Poland, left in search of better work opportunities abroad while retaining permanent resident status in Poland itself.  
 
After Poland joined the EU, Poles acquired the right to work in some EU countries, while some of the members implemented transition periods. The UK, Ireland, Sweden and Malta allowed Poles to work freely without any limitations from the start. Peaking in 2007, almost 2.3 million Poles lived abroad, mostly in Western Europe. This has been the largest wave of economic migration of Poles abroad since the Polish emigration to the United States in late 19th and early 20th century, which is estimated to have brought between about 1.5 million, and 3.5 million Poles to the United States.

Numbers of Polish people
Emigration of Poles, relatively modest in the first decade or so after the fall of communism in 1989, increased significantly in the late 1990s, with the share of emigrants in the overall Polish population growing from 0.5% (~100,000) in 1998 to 2.3% (~600,000) in 2008. The percentage of young people attending university has also increased dramatically since 1989 resulting in a 'brain overflow' by the time Poland joined the European Union in 2004. The number of young adults speaking English doubled in just one decade between 1996 and 2008.

Since the opening of the labour market following Poland joining the European Union in 2004, Poland experienced a mass migration of over 2 million abroad. As of 2011, 52 out of 1,000 Polish citizens have lived outside the country; estimated at 2.2 million by the Polish Central Statistics Office (GUS), and 2.6–2.7 million by the journalists. GUS statistics estimate that the number of long term Polish immigrants abroad have risen from 0.7 million in 2002 to a peak number of almost 2.3 million in 2007, and has since declined to 2 million by 201011. It has remained relatively stable at that level for a short period, following the uncertainty of Global Recession of 200708, By December 2015, 12% of Polish labor population left for UK to work there.

According to a 2013 survey, approximately 14% percent of adult Poles have worked abroad since 2004 (approximately a quarter for over a year); 69% have a family member of a close friend who lives abroad, and approximately 24% are open to immigration. Majority of Polish migrants or those considering leaving are young; according to a 2014 survey approximately 90% of Poles under 34 have considered some form of migration. Over the past decade or so, there has been a visible trend that migrants are increasingly likely to be young and well-educated.
 According to poll from 2007 for around 29% of Polish emigrants their job abroad is the first job they had in life.
Professor Krystyna Iglicka has estimated that up to half a million Poles emigrated in 2013. 
As of 2011, approximately 80% of Polish emigrants settle in the countries of the European Union. As of 2013, the largest group of modern Polonia can be found in the United Kingdom (550,000), followed by that in Germany (425,608), and in France (350,000 as of 2012). Significant Polish presence can also be found in Ireland (115,000 as of 2013), in Italy (94,000 as of 2011), and in the Netherlands (103,000 as of 2013). As of 2011, the largest groups of recent Polish emigrants outside EU were those in the United States (243,000) and in Canada (52,000). The number of Poles in Norway, itself not an EU member, has significantly increased recently (from 43,000 in 2011 to 71,000 as of 2013).

Different regions of Poland have significantly different emigration patterns; as of 2011 the voivodeships of Poland with the highest number of emigrants were the Opole Voivodeship (10.6%), Podlaskie Voivodeship (9.1%), Podkarpackie Voivodeship (8.4%) and Warmińsko-mazurskie Voivodeship (7.5%), contrasted with much smaller emigration percentage from Mazowieckie Voivodeship (2.8%), Łódzkie Voivodeship (2.9%) and Wielkopolskie Voivodeship (3.1%). Overall, the emigration is higher in the poorer, eastern region of Poland.

Reasons
Primary reasons for the migration are almost always economic in nature. It has disproportionately affected young Poles, in their 20s and 30s. Poland joining the EU allowed young Polish citizens to seek out a variety of jobs outside of Poland at a lower personal expense. Wages for many of these jobs were higher in countries like the United Kingdom, Republic of Ireland, France, Germany, and the Netherlands. Young Poles then had the opportunity to seek out higher wages while simultaneously traveling for the sake of adventure and exploration.

Due to a large increase in the number of Poles attending universities after the fall of communism, the supply of educated workers exceeded the domestic demand and as a result many young Poles migrated to the west. According to a survey conducted in 2011, 33% of those questioned pointed to higher wages as motivation for emigration and 31% to unemployment, with 3% stating professional development and 16% declaring family reasons.

Consequences
There are concerns about the effect of long term immigration patterns on the demographics of Poland, such as depopulation of regions that do not attract young people.

Positive consequences of the migration include gains in skills and familiarity with global culture. Estimates also suggest that the emigration raised wages for those workers who stayed behind, contributing about 11% of total wage growth between 1998 and 2007. The migration has also been associated with lowering of unemployment in Poland and remittances of approximately 41 billion euros in the Polish economy.

Before the refugee crisis in 2015, Poles generally felt more positive about EU-related migration. Most Poles were not troubled by the idea of an increase in Islamism in their country or of some intrusion of their culture from those who were immigrating to Poland. Instead, many viewed this type of migration as an opportunity for freedom of movement. These Poles were optimistic that those who emigrated to countries such as Ireland would gain entrepreneurial skills that could help Poland when and if they decided to return.

A great deal of the impact that migration had on Poland had to do with the relationship between Polish citizens and foreign countries. Since the EU accession, large numbers of Polish citizens have lived in another European country at one time. Their past experiences with living in other countries has helped shaped their lives and the lives of other Polish citizens, by introducing new cultural ideas to Poland upon returning.

Returning migrants and reversal
With better economic conditions and Polish salaries at 70% of the EU average in 2016, the emigration trend started to decrease in the 2010s and more workforce is needed in the country, so the Polish Minister of Development Mateusz Morawiecki encouraged Poles abroad to return to Poland.

Since 2015, migration out of Poland has stabilized, and some migrants who had left the country in earlier years have returned. In 2019, the number of Poles living abroad had fallen for the first time since the Great Recession. The number of returning Poles has increased, with returning emigrants surpassing departing citizens from 2019 to 2022. Reasons cited for this phenomenon include improved economic conditions in Poland, a perceived equal/higher standard of living at an affordable cost, desire to be closer to family, sense of xenophobia (whether real or imagined) in host countries, uncertainty surrounding the COVID-19 pandemic, and individual political events such as Brexit.

See also

Historical demographics of Poland
Emigration from Poland to Germany after World War II
Freedom of movement for workers#Transitional provisions in new member states
Poles
Swedish Poles               
Polish diaspora

References

External links
 2014 - Raport CEED: Migracje w XXI wieku z perspektywy krajów Europy Środkowo-Wschodniej – szansa czy zagrożenie? 
 Migracje ludności, GUS (list of publications) 
 Migracje zagraniczne ludności - NSP 2011, GUS (not included in the list of publications above) 
 Poland's emigration headache in The Economist 5 November 2013
 Poland: Fidèles à la Pologne, même s'ils vivent en France by Claire Fleury in L'Obs Journaliste,  9 May 2014.
 Poland: Immigration to UK is back for good life despite economic crisis by Helen Pidd in The Guardian,  27 May 2011.
 Dutch language central office of statistics report of 2012

Demographic history of Poland
Economic history of Poland
Internal migrations in Europe
History of Poland (1989–present)
Polish communities
Polish minorities
Contemporary migrations